Alamdar meaning Standard-bearer, may refer to:
 Alamdar, Ardabil
 Alamdar, East Azerbaijan
 Alamdar, Fars
 Alamdar, Hamadan
 Alamdar-e Olya, Hamadan Province
 Alamdar-e Sofla, Hamadan Province
 Alamdar, Khuzestan
 Alamdar, Mazandaran
 Alamdar, Razavi Khorasan

See also
Alemdar